Graball (also known as Grabal) is an unincorporated community in Gibson County, Tennessee, United States. Graball is located along U.S. Route 45E and Tennessee State Route 43 at the southern border of Milan.

References

Unincorporated communities in Gibson County, Tennessee
Unincorporated communities in Tennessee